The Oliver Group Champions Cup is an event in the Outback Champions Series for senior tennis players. It is held each year in Naples, Florida, and it was known as the Champions Cup Naples prior to 2007 when sponsorship for the event was picked up by The Oliver Group , a Florida-based real estate development firm.

Finals results

2008
Todd Martin defeated John McEnroe 6-3, 6-1

2007
Wayne Ferreira defeated Aaron Krickstein 6-3, 6-3

2006
Jim Courier defeated Pat Cash 6-4, 7-6(8)

Recurring sporting events established in 2006
Tennis tournaments in the United States
Champions Series (senior men's tennis tour)
Naples, Florida